Ferretti is an Italian surname. Notable people with the surname include:

 Alberta Ferretti (born 1950), Italian fashion designer and dressmaker
 Andrea Ferretti (footballer, born 1985), Italian footballer
 Andrea Ferretti (footballer, born 1986), Italian footballer
 Andrée Ferretti (born 1935), Canadian political figure and author
 Antonio Ferretti (born 1957), Swiss former racing cyclist
 Daniele Ferretti (born 1986), Italian footballer
 Dante Ferretti (born 1943), Italian production designer, art director and costume designer
 Elena Ferretti (born 1960), Italian Eurobeat and Italo disco singer
 Fernando Ferretti (1949-2011), Brazilian footballer
 Francesca Ferretti (born 1984), Italian volleyball player
 Gabriel Ferretti (1385-1456), Italian Roman Catholic priest
 Gabriele Ferretti (1795-1860), Italian Catholic cardinal
 Giancarlo Ferretti (born 1941), Italian former bicycle racing team manager
 Gian Pietro Ferretti (died 1557), Bishop of Milos and Lavello
 Giovanni Ferretti (footballer) (1940-2007), Italian footballer
 Giovanni Ferretti (composer) (1540-1609), Italian composer
 Giovanni Domenico Ferretti (1692-1768) Italian painter
 Giovanni Lindo Ferretti (born 1953), Italian singer-songwriter, composer and author
 Giuseppe Milesi Pironi Ferretti (1817-1873), Italian Catholic cardinal
 Johad Ferretti (born 1994), Italian footballer
 Lando Ferretti (1895-1977), Italian journalist, politician and sports administrator
 Luca Ferretti (born 1983), Italian footballer
 Marisa Ferretti Barth (1931–2021), Canadian senator
 Massimiliano Ferretti (born 1966), Italian former water polo player
 Pope Pius IX, born Giovanni Maria Mastai Ferretti (1792-1878), Italian pope of the Catholic Church
 Raimondo Ferretti (1650-1719), Archbishop of Ravenna and Bishop of Recanati e Loreto
 Ricardo Ferretti (born 1954), Mexican football manager
 Vasco Ferretti (born 1935), Italian novelist, historian, professor and journalist

In fiction
 Louis Ferretti, a character from the Stargate media franchise
 Renato Ferretti, called René, a main character from the Italian TV series Boris and the following film

Other uses
 Pier Giorgio Ferretti, pseudonym used by Giuliano Biagetti, Italian director and screenwriter

Italian-language surnames